The Andrus Ansip's third cabinet was the Cabinet of Estonia between 6 April 2011 and 26 March 2014. It was a coalition cabinet of the  free market liberal Estonian Reform Party (7 portfolios) and conservative Union of Pro Patria and Res Publica (6 portfolios).

The cabinet was formed following the 2011 parliamentary election. It left office after the resignation of Andrus Ansip, who had decided not to run in the next elections and wished to enable his successor to lead his party into 2015 election. During the reign of the cabinet Ansip became the longest-serving incumbent head of government in the European Union on 4 December 2013.

It was succeeded by the Taavi Rõivas' cabinet on 26 March 2014.

Ministers

See also
Politics of Estonia

External links
Official Website of Estonian Government – Government 06 April 2011 – 26 March 2014

References

Cabinets of Estonia
2011 establishments in Estonia
2014 disestablishments in Estonia
Cabinets established in 2011
Cabinets disestablished in 2014